Twisted Pair is a 2018 American science fiction psychological thriller film directed, produced, scored, edited, and written by Neil Breen. The film stars Neil Breen, Sara Meritt, Siohbun Ebrahimi, Denise Bellini, Marty Dasis, Brad Stein, John Smith Burns, Art MacHenster, Greg Smith Burns, Ada Masters, and Jason Moriglio. The film centers around identical twin brothers, Cade and Cale Altair, who become hybrid Artificial Intelligence entities, who are torn in different directions to achieve justice for humanity.

Twisted Pair was theatrically released in the United States on October 3, 2018, by Neil Breen Films, LLC. Like Breen's previous outings, it was largely panned by critics and audiences, but has since developed a cult following. A sequel, Cade: The Tortured Crossing, had its world premiere on February 25, 2023, at the Regal Cinemas L.A. Live.

Plot 
During their youth, Cade and his identical twin brother Cale were abducted by an unknown power and modified to become Humanoids, secret agents who are out to stop evil. Cale didn't fit in with the program and was fired. Cade, as an adult, is introduced on a mission where he is protecting troops. He returns to headquarters and meets with his boss, who suggests that he take a vacation. Cade laments not having seen his brother since before he became a Humanoid.

Cale meets with a lawyer, an executive and the President of The Bank and interrogates them for a while before he shoots one of them in the leg and leaves to do pills with his girlfriend Donna. Cade's boss tells him about programmable virtual reality and how a man named Cuzzx is going to use it to conduct the biggest cyber and terror attack ever. Cade decides to investigate, but while investigating around town he bumps into Alana. He offers to buy her a drink to apologize, but she says she's very busy and leaves. Cade attempts to make a date with the woman, before she departs. She doesn't come back but later he sees her and decides to follow her home. Cade breaks into her house and they fight, before they abruptly stop fighting, revealing that they'd been in a relationship the whole time.

Cade breaks into a Cuzzx lab to find clues for his mission. Cade finds four guys wearing VR goggles who are in some kind of trance, and in the next room, a very old person dressed like Cuzzx meeting with people. The men disappear, due to the programmable virtual reality and Cade reports back to his boss. Cade takes Alana, his girlfriend, out to dinner, and a mysterious man stabs Cade's homeless friend, taking his cell phone. Meanwhile, Cale tracks down and murders a rich executive, but the police find no evidence because Cale picked up the shell casings. He did, however, drop a syringe. Cade pretends to be a rich investor who wants to give money to the Cuzzx Empire, which gets him a tour of Cuzzx' house. Donna, Cale's pillhead girlfriend, breaks up with him and then runs into Cade, demanding to know where she can get more drugs and why he shaved his beard. Cade responds by going "I never had a beard" repeatedly. He gives the girl some money to find a place to stay and they hug. Alana sees and gets jealous.

Cade then decides to take down the Cuzzx Empire and goes into the boiler room to enact his plan. After his empire is destroyed, Cuzzx flees the country. Cade goes home and Alana pulls a gun on him, as she was working for Cuzzx the whole time. They shoot each other, and Alana dies in his arms. In the virtual reality forest, Cade and Alana reunite, they embrace and Alana tells him she loves him, and then disappears. The film ends with Cade addressing the audience, accepting the loss of Alana, and stating that humanity will eventually live in a virtual universe. Before the credits, the message "Cade Altair will return" appears onscreen.

Cast

Production

Filming 
Principal photography began on September 2, 2017, at Nevada State College, with John Mastrogiacomo serving as cinematographer. In April 2018, during post-production on Twisted Pair, Breen released a trailer for the film.

Release 
Twisted Pair was theatrically released in the United States on October 3, 2018 and in the United Kingdom on February 9, 2019, by Neil Breen Films, LLC.

Reception 
/Film gave a review of the trailer with "Breen shows up playing a pair of identical twins standing in front of what looks like a screensaver. Things just get better/weirder from there, and we're treated to one of the worst (best?) fake beards in history. Watching this trailer, you start to think that maybe this is a very elaborate joke, and Breen is just messing with us. But I assure you, Breen is serious, and that makes it even better."

Twisted Pair has received negative reviews by several critics. Leor Galil of the Chicago Reader gave a negative review by stating "Twisted Pair doesn't make much sense, it drags in parts, and it sometimes resembles the ramblings of a tinfoil-hatted conspiracy theorist. But, somehow, Breen unexpectedly emerges with flecks of gold, little moments that have stubbornly attached themselves to my memory". Gena Radcliffe of The Spool also gave a negative review by stating "The deeply strange Neil Breen returns with an even more deeply strange entry in his filmography of homespun, barely-coherent psychological thrillers." She elaborated by stating "What little plot exists is incoherent... Breen himself doesn't understand what's happening in his own movie, or, at least, what kind of movie he wants it to be. He drops phrases like "artificial intelligence" and "programmable virtual reality," and they don't have any meaning or bearing on the plot. Though he describes Twisted Pair in publicity material as a "psychological thriller," it is most definitely not that. What it does have are some elements of science fiction, a murder mystery, espionage, romance, and even a touch of domestic drama, but none of it is cohesive, and none of it goes anywhere. They're all their own little mini-plots, like Short Cuts if it was made by an alien who only had a rudimentary grasp of English." She mentions a positive element of the film with "There's a seed of something interesting planted here – the villain looks like a dollar store Elvis Costello, carries a bowl of diamonds around, and talks like his voice is being disguised on an episode of Dateline NBC. Unfortunately, time that could have been spent developing this character, or at least explaining who he is and what motivates him (and why his scarf keeps changing colors), is wasted on long scenes of Breen indifferently creeping around in an empty laboratory."

Grady Bolding of Cultured Vultures gave a negative review by stating "It has its moments of hilarity which kill any boredom that might ensue, but otherwise, it's a raging fire that cannot be put out." Bolding describes the positive elements of the film with "The only strength with Neil Breen's film is quite similar to what the great Tommy Wiseau did with The Room. While The Room can be seen as an unintentional takedown of the superficiality of Hollywood drama films, Breen's film(s) provide an antithesis to the overly-hyped mercenary-for-hire/vigilante agent films seen today in American theaters. American culture has always championed the idea of a lone warrior setting out to right the wrongs of society, if not the world. Twisted Pair efficiently reflects this part of American culture, but provides unintentional satire. The All-American hero is a noticeably aged Neil Breen who either makes his enemies think about their actions or makes them pay for it. He is not a stocky, barrel-chested figure like Matt Damon or Chuck Norris. He's so aged and withered that it makes him 100% average." Bolding summarizes Breen's work by stating that "any audience can – and will – laugh at Neil Breen's mediocrity, but they will easily be able to project themselves into what he's trying to accomplish. Breen fails across the board, but he gives us something worth laughing at and enjoying. In this respect, Breen accomplishes his mission when it comes to the most basic tenant [sic] of producing a film: providing entertainment."

Diego Olguín of The Charlatan also gave a negative review by stating "The surreal editing makes the film almost incomprehensible; the soundtrack is pretty much stock trailer music; the special effects look straight out of some mid 1990s straight-to-VHS movie; and the script is full of nonsensical dialogue, amplified by the cast's wooden deliveries. However, no film must reach perfection in order to be enjoyable, and this is a clear example of this." Olguín continues by discussing some of the positives of the film, "While Twisted Pair fails in every level in being an action film with social commentary, it does succeed as an unintentional comedy. While the CGI looks cheap and fake, that only adds to the fun during scenes where explosions awkwardly fill a classroom. Breen's acting capabilities rival Tommy Wiseau's in how weird and inhuman they are. Watching him trying his best to emote sadness as he tries to persuade his brother (which is Breen with a cheap beard and a hoodie) to turn himself in to the cops is something to be witnessed—preferably with a few friends and some drinks. There is also a sense of honest effort on the film, crappiness aside. You can feel that Breen tried his best to deliver a legitimately good movie, like a modern-day Ed Wood—famous only for people roasting his past films, but still not giving up."

Sequel 
On March 11, 2019, Breen confirmed that a sequel was in development. On October 3, 2022, Breen confirmed that filming on his latest project had wrapped via his Twitter account. On December 16, 2022, Breen announced that the film is titled Cade: The Tortured Crossing and had its world premiere in early 2023, in film festivals. The film stars Breen, Judy Lay, Gwendolyn Brown, Eric Lum, Landon Munoz, Amy Solomon, Nicole Butler, Leslie McKinney, Jennifer Estrella, Daryl Morris, Kevon Tyree, Talus Night, Jeremy Chavez, Tommy Lawler, Derek Powell, and Addyson Medley. In February 2023, the film won the award for "Best Fantasy Film" and was nominated for the "People's Choice Award", at the Hollywood Reel Independent Film Festival, before its world premiere on February 25, 2023, at the Regal Cinemas L.A. Live.

References

External links 
 
 
 

2010s science fiction thriller films
2010s spy thriller films
2018 films
2018 psychological thriller films
American independent films
American psychological thriller films
American science fiction thriller films
American spy thriller films
Films about artificial intelligence
Films about heroin addiction
Films about mass surveillance
Films about security and surveillance
Films about twin brothers
Films about virtual reality
Films set in universities and colleges
Films shot in Nevada
Films shot in the Las Vegas Valley
2010s English-language films
2010s American films